The 1975 UCLA Bruins football team represented the University of California, Los Angeles in the 1975 NCAA Division I football season. Led by second-year head coach Dick Vermeil, the Bruins won their first Pacific-8 championship in a decade and were 8–2–1 in the regular season. On New Year's Day, UCLA upset previously undefeated and top-ranked Ohio State in the Rose Bowl and climbed to fifth in the final rankings.

Regular season
Coming off an injury-plagued 1974 season at 6–3–2, UCLA began the season ranked #16. A season-opening 37–21 win over Iowa State in the Los Angeles Memorial Coliseum saw them move up to twelfth; this was followed by a 34–28 win over #10 Tennessee. But they stumbled in a turnover-plagued 20–20 tie at Air Force; second-ranked Ohio State traveled west and handed UCLA its first loss of the season,  on October 4. After the game, head coach Woody Hayes prophetically told his team that they would be facing UCLA again in the Rose Bowl. UCLA was the only opponent to score more than 14 points in a game all season against Ohio State, and they did it twice.

The Ohio State loss dropped the Bruins out of the top 20, but they returned to #13 after wins over Stanford, Washington State, and a key win over California. But another loss, this time to Washington 17–13, dropped them back out of the top 20 and resulted in a five-way tie at the top of the Pac-8 between UCLA, California, Stanford, USC, and Washington.

After a pair of wins over the Oregon schools, the Bruins went into their season-ending game against rival USC needing a win to go to the Rose Bowl; a loss or tie would send California to Pasadena. Despite fumbling 11 times and losing 8, UCLA beat the Trojans 25–22.  UCLA ended up tied with California for the Pac-8 championship, but advanced to the Rose Bowl on the strength of their 28–14 win over the Golden Bears. The Bruins went into the Rose Bowl ranked #11.  Ironically, the 1975 USC-UCLA game was legendary coach John McKay and Vermeil's final game at the Coliseum.

It was the only bowl appearance for Vermeil in his two seasons at UCLA; a month later he left for the Philadelphia Eagles of the National Football League.

Schedule

Game summaries

Ohio State

1st quarter scoring: UCLA – James Sarpy 13-yard pass from John Sciarra (Brett White kick); OSU – Greene 2-yard run (Klaban kick)

2nd quarter scoring: OSU – Johnson 3-yard run (Klaban kick); OSU – Johnson 2-yard run (Klaban kick); OSU – Greene 17-yard run (Klaban kick)

3rd quarter scoring: OSU – A. Griffin 17-yard run (Klaban kick); OSU – Klaban 34-yard field goal;	UCLA – Eddie Ayers 2-yard run (White kick)

4th quarter scoring: UCLA – Ayers 1-yard run (kick failed); OSU – Klaban 42-yard field goal

Ohio State (Rose Bowl) 

1st quarter scoring: Ohio State – Tom Klaban 42-yard field goal

2nd quarter scoring: No score

3rd quarter scoring: UCLA – Brett White 33-yard field goal; UCLA – Wally Henry 16-yard pass from John Sciarra (White kick failed); UCLA – Henry 67-yard pass from Sciarra (White kick)

4th quarter scoring: Ohio State – Pete Johnson 3-yard run (Klaban kick); UCLA – Wendell Tyler 54-yard run (White kick)

Players and coaches

Roster

34 returning lettermen from Coach Dick Vermeil's first team that was 6–3–2 in 1974.

Offense
 89 Norm Andersen, SE
 70 Gus Coppens LT
 73 Phil McKinnely, LG
 62 Mitch Kahn, C
 51 Randy Cross, RG
 75 Jack DeMartinis, RT
 7 Rick Walker, TE
 15 John Sciarra QB
 22 Wendell Tyler, LHB
 30 Eddie Ayers, RHB
 8 Wally Henry, FL

Defense
 42 Jeff Smith, S
 68 Tim Tennigkeit, LT
 56 Terry Tautolo, ILB
 59 Pete Pele, NG
 Kelly Stroich, ILB
 90 Bob Crawford, RT
 83 Dale Curry, OLB
 87 Raymond Burks, OLB
 29 Barney Person, LCB
 21 Oscar Edwards, RCB
 Matt Fahl, S
 88 Pat Schmidt, S
 82 John Terando DB

Specialists
 34 Brett White, PK
 6 John Sullivan, P

Coaches
 Dick Vermeil, head coach
 Lynn Stiles, assistant head coach/defensive coordinator
 Jim Criner, linebackers/tight ends
 Terry Donahue, offensive line
 Rod Dowhower, offensive coordinator/quarterbacks/wide receivers
 Jerry Long, offensive line/defensive line
 Billie Matthews, running backs
 Bill McPherson, defensive line
 Carl Peterson, wide receivers/tight ends
 Dick Tomey, defensive backs 
 Mike Flores, graduate assistant

Awards and honors
 John Sciarra, QB, All-Conference, NCAA Post-Graduate Scholarship, ESPN The Magazine/CoSIDA Academic All America, National Football Foundation and Hall of Fame Scholarship, NCAA Top Eight Award, inducted into the College Football Hall of Fame (2014) 
 Randy Cross, G, All-Conference, inducted into the College Football Hall of Fame (2010)
 Fulton Kuykendall, LB, All-Conference
 Head coach Dick Vermeil will be inducted into the Rose Bowl Hall of Fame as a member of the Class of 2014.
 Barney Person, CB, Lead nation & UCLA in interceptions, made key Rose Bowl interception

1975 team players in the NFL
The following players were claimed in the 1975 NFL Draft.

The following players were claimed in the 1976 NFL Draft.

The following player was claimed in the 1977 NFL Draft.

References

External links
 Sports Reference - 1975 UCLA football season

UCLA
UCLA Bruins football seasons
Pac-12 Conference football champion seasons
Rose Bowl champion seasons
UCLA Bruins footbal
UCLA Bruins football